Tagesthemen is one of Germany's main daily television news magazines, presented by journalists Caren Miosga and Ingo Zamperoni. Second only to the 20:00 Tagesschau ("Review of the Day") Tagesthemen ("Issues of the Day") is ARD's most important newscast. It is different in style and content from Tagesschau and is broadcast Mondays to Thursdays at 22:15, Fridays at 23:15, Saturdays at varying times and Sundays at 22:45. On special news occasions, a Tagesthemen extra is also broadcast before the main show. Each Tagesthemen broadcast has a single host, a single newsreader for the news block, usually from the earlier Tagesschau, a weather presenter broadcasting from Frankfurt, and a presenter for the sports block on the weekends. Previously recorded Tagesthemen newscasts can also be seen internationally via YouTube on Tagesschau's YouTube Channel.

History
In January 1978, Tagesthemen replaced the late edition of Tagesschau, which had been broadcast until then. The broadcast lasts a half hour on weekdays; it is shorter on Fridays (15 minutes) Saturdays (20 minutes) and Sundays (15 minutes).

In contrast to Tagesschau, which provides only an overview of the news, Tagesthemen is designed to also provide the viewer with more information, context and background. The program usually features four to five segments on the stories and themes of the day.

Previously, the program used a variation of the Tagesschau theme, Hammond Fantasy, with the first and last notes in the same keys. From 1997 to 2014, Tagesthemen used the same music as Tagesschau. Currently Tagesthemen uses a different variation of the Hammond Fantasy, similar to the original Tagesthemen theme.

Tagesschau editorial staff provide a daily news summary to the program. A weather report was part of the news summary until 2002: since then it has been presented by a meteorologist, in cooperation with Meteomedia AG, a privately owned company. Since 2020, the weather report is presented from the ARD weather center at the studios of Hessischer Rundfunk in Frankfurt.

Tagesthemen's market share sank with the opening of media competition in Germany; nevertheless, it still lies today at about 12% — this amounts to about 2.5 million viewers per broadcast. Tagesthemen is one of the most influential opinion builders in Germany.

Presenters
Since 1 October 1985 Tagesthemen, like Tagesschau, has been presented by various hosts. Since the start, the hosts alternate weekly.

The hosts write their scripts themselves; the presentation generally has a much looser style than Tagesschau. Since the Tagesthemen hosts are not restricted to simply reading the daily dispatches, they can develop a lively, personal style compared to their colleagues at Tagesschau, although they are still required to be neutral and objective.

Current presenters

Former presenters

1985 onwards

1978-1985 
Wolf von Lojewski, 1978-1979
Klaus Stephan, 1978
Alexander von Bentheim, 1978 - 1980
Barbara Dickmann, 1979 - 1983
Edmund Gruber, 1984 - ?
Gisela Mahlmann 1980-1981
Klaus Bednarz, 1982 - 1983
Gerhard Fuchs, 1982-1985
Klaus-Peter Siegloch, 1982-1985
Günther von Lojewski, 1978 - ???
Günther Müggenburg, 1978 - 1983
Ernst-Dieter Lueg, 1978 - 1985
Rüdiger Hoffmann, 1982 - 1985
Otto Deppe, 1982-1983
Elke Herrmann, 1984-1986
Hannelore Gadatsch, 1984-1985

Trivia
 In 2001, as part of a bet that he lost in Wetten, dass..?, the show's host, Thomas Gottschalk, had to introduce the weather on Tagesthemen.
On 12 August 2014 Tagesthemen host Caren Miosga honored the deceased Hollywood actor Robin Williams by standing on the host's desk. With this gesture she alluded to Williams' movie Dead Poets Society, one of Williams' most well-known movies in whose final scene pupils stand atop of their desks to show respect toward their teacher played by the deceased actor.
The opening theme of Tagesthemen on 23 October 2020 was played live from the studio in rock style arranged by Berlin rock band Die Ärzte.

References

External links

Official site (in German)
Tagesthemen via Tagesschau'''s YouTube Channel.
Wikipedia.de: Alle bilden alle - Report by Tagesthemen on the German-language Wikipedia (in German)
Interview: "Kontrollinstanz sind die Nutzer selbst" - Interview by Tagesthemen'' (in German)
Interview with Ulrich Wickert: "Bunt und locker flockig reicht nicht" (in German, by sbznet.de)

ARD (broadcaster)
1978 German television series debuts
German television news shows
1980s German television series
1990s German television series
2000s German television series
2010s German television series
German-language television shows
Das Erste original programming